Estonia has participated in the Eurovision Song Contest 27 times since making its debut in 1994. Its first appearance would have taken place in 1993 but a qualification round was installed for seven former Eastern Bloc countries hoping to make their debut in the contest, with Estonia failing to qualify. Estonia has won the contest once, in 2001.

Estonia's first participation in 1994 was unsuccessful, finishing 24th (out of 25). Estonia went on to finish in the top eight in six out of seven contests (1996–2002), with Maarja-Liis Ilus and Ivo Linna fifth, Maarja-Liis Ilus returning to finish eighth (1997), Evelin Samuel and Camille sixth and Ines fourth, before Tanel Padar, Dave Benton and 2XL gave Estonia its first victory in 2001. This made Estonia the first former Soviet country to win the contest and the second eastern European country to win, after Yugoslavia in 1989.

Since the introduction of the semi-final round in 2004, Estonia has failed to reach the final on nine occasions and has reached the top ten four times, with Urban Symphony sixth (2009), Ott Lepland sixth (2012), Elina Born and Stig Rästa seventh and Elina Nechayeva eighth. Estonia's total of ten top ten results is more than any other Baltic country.

History 

Estonia's record at the contest was a successful one from 1996 to 2002, only failing once to make the top 10 (in 1998 when it ended up in 12th place).

The country's first win came in 2001, when Tanel Padar and Dave Benton, along with 2XL, sang "Everybody" and received 198 points, therefore making Estonia the first former USSR country to win the Contest and the second country of eastern Europe after Yugoslavia. The 2002 contest was held in Estonia, in the capital city Tallinn, where Sahlene finished third for the hosts (tied with the UK).

From 2004 to 2008 Estonia failed to qualify to the finals, mostly receiving poor results – during that period its best entry was 11th place in the 2004 semi-final by Neiokõsõ with "", sung in the Võro language.

Despite news that Estonia might withdraw from the 2009 contest (set to be held in Moscow, Russia) due to the war in South Ossetia, Eesti Rahvusringhääling (ERR) confirmed that due to public demand, Estonia would send an entry to Moscow. After a new national final, was introduced to select the Estonian entry, the winner was Urban Symphony with "", which had beaten the televoting favourite, Laura, by the votes of a jury.

At the second semi-final of the 2009 contest, Urban Symphony qualified Estonia to the final of the contest for the first time since 2003, receiving 115 points and placing 3rd. The group performed 15th in the final, where it received 129 points, placing 6th out of 25 competing entries as well as being the highest placing non-English language song at the 2009 competition.

In 2010, Estonia failed to qualify to the final, with the song "Siren" by Malcolm Lincoln.

In 2011, Estonia was represented by Getter Jaani with the song "Rockefeller Street". She was the bookmakers' pre-contest favorite for victory along with France. She qualified to the final but eventually placed 24th of 25 entries- tying Silvi Vrait's 1994 result for Estonia's worst placing in the contest final.

Since 2012, Estonia has achieved three more top ten results. Ott Lepland qualified Estonia to the final of the  contest, with his song "", ending up 4th in the second semi-final. In the final, he equalled Estonia's result of 1999 and 2009, placing 6th.

Participation overview

Hostings

Related involvement

Conductors

Heads of delegation

Costume designers

Commentators and spokespersons

Photogallery

Notes

References 

 
Countries in the Eurovision Song Contest